The Regional State Archives in Tromsø is a regional state archives situated at Breivika in Tromsø, Norway. Part of the National Archival Services of Norway, it is responsible for archiving documents from state institutions in the counties of Troms and Finnmark, as well as Svalbard. The facility is located at the campus of the University of Tromsø. The collection includes 9.5 shelf-kilometers of material, with magazine capacity for 22.

The agency was at first an office established in 1952, subordinate the Regional State Archives in Trondheim. It became an independent office from 1987 and the facility opened the following year.

References

National Archival Services of Norway
Organisations based in Tromsø
1952 establishments in Norway
Government agencies established in 1952